Vince Aso (born 5 January 1995) is a New Zealand rugby union player who currently plays as a midfield back for  Wellington in New Zealand's domestic Mitre 10 Cup and the  in the international Super Rugby competition.

Early career

Born and raised in Auckland, Aso attended St Peter's College in his hometown where he played first XV rugby.   After finishing high school, he began playing for Ponsonby in the Gallaher Shield, Auckland's Premier club rugby competition.   He also started working his way towards a Bachelor of Human Studies degree at the Victoria University of Wellington while supplementing his earnings with a part-time job as a builder.

Senior career

Aso debuted for Auckland during the 2013 ITM Cup and racked up 4 tries in 7 appearances despite being aged just 18. He found opportunities harder to come by in 2014 especially in his preferred position in the midfield, playing only 3 times and scoring a solitary try.

Super Rugby

Aged just 20 and with only 10 provincial games under his belt, Aso was named in the  squad for the 2015 Super Rugby season.   Having worked with 'Canes head-coach Chris Boyd before at New Zealand Under-20 level, Aso arrived in New Zealand's capital highly-rated, but lacking in experience, therefore it was perhaps no surprise that despite making the replacements bench several times during the year, he was unable to get on the park at any point to make his Super Rugby debut.

Aso struck up a fine midfield partnership with both Ngani Laumape and Willis Halaholo and scored 2 tries in 16 appearances during his first season as a regular in the Hurricanes starting XV.

International

Aso was a New Zealand Schools representative in 2012 and later went on to be a member of the New Zealand Under-20 sides which competed in the 2014 IRB Junior World Championship and 2015 World Rugby Under 20 Championship.   After finishing 3rd in the 2014 edition, Aso's stunning solo effort helped propel them to a 21-16 victory over England in the final of the 2015 tournament which was held in Italy.

Career Honours

New Zealand Under-20

World Rugby Under 20 Championship - 2015

Hurricanes

Super Rugby - 2016

Super Rugby Statistics

References

1995 births
Living people
New Zealand rugby union players
Rugby union centres
Rugby union wings
Auckland rugby union players
People educated at St Peter's College, Auckland
Rugby union players from Auckland
Hurricanes (rugby union) players
Moana Pasifika players
Wellington rugby union players
Saitama Wild Knights players